The 2010–11 The Summit League men's basketball season is the 29th college basketball season in the conference's existence.  The conference features ten teams that are competing for The Summit League regular season and tournament titles.

Awards and honors

The Summit League All-Conference teams

References